Liam Brathwaite (born 6 November 2000), is a Barbadian professional footballer who plays as a goalkeeper for the Barbados national team.

He debuted internationally with the U20 team on 3 November 2018 in a match against Costa Rica in a 0–2 defeat during the 2018 CONCACAF U-20 Championship held in the United States.

Brathwaite made his senior debut on 5 September 2019 against non-FIFA member Saint Martin in a 4–0 victory.

He last appeared at the 2022 FIFA World Cup qualifying match against Dominica on 8 June 2021 in a 1–1 draw.

References

2000 births
Living people
Barbadian footballers
Association football goalkeepers
Barbados international footballers
Barbados under-20 international footballers